Church Run is a  long 1st order tributary to Oil Creek in Crawford County, Pennsylvania.

Course
Church Run rises on the Thompson Creek divide about 2 miles north of Titusville, Pennsylvania.  Church Run then flows southwest and south to meet Oil Creek at Titusville.

Watershed
Church Run drains  of area, receives about 45.0 in/year of precipitation, has a topographic wetness index of 438.82, and has an average water temperature of 7.55 °C.  The watershed is 66% forested.

References

Additional Images

Rivers of Pennsylvania
Rivers of Crawford County, Pennsylvania